"The Portable Star" is a science fiction short story by American writer Isaac Asimov, which appeared in the Winter 1955 issue of Thrilling Wonder Stories.  "The Portable Star" was Asimov's least favorite story.

Writing and publication
The story was written in March 1954, and Asimov first submitted it to Frederik Pohl, who was then an editor at Ballantine Books, for inclusion in an anthology of original stories.  Pohl rejected "The Portable Star", telling Asimov in no uncertain terms how bad the story was.  It was also rejected by John W. Campbell for Astounding Science Fiction and H. L. Gold for Galaxy Science Fiction.  Asimov finally sold it on May 25 to Sam Mines of Thrilling Wonder.  Asimov reread the story when it was published, and decided that Pohl, Campbell, and Gold had been right in considering it a bad story.  In his autobiography In Joy Still Felt, Asimov states that "The Portable Star" was his least favorite story of all time.  "I wasn't aware of what I was doing when I wrote it, but on reading it after it was published it seemed to me that I was deliberately trying to put sex into it to try to keep up with a new trend."  Asimov never allowed the story to be reprinted, or put it in one of his collections.  The only other time it appeared in Asimov's lifetime was when the publishers of Thrilling Wonder exercised their right to reprint the story, placing it in a one-shot magazine called A Treasury of Great Science Fiction Stories without Asimov's permission.  It was also reprinted (with the permission of the Asimov estate) in 2007, when Winston Engle revived Thrilling Wonder Stories with an anthology of mixed reprint and new stories.

Plot summary
The story concerns two couples, the Brookses and the Van Hornes, who go on a six-month space tour in a "flivver" owned by Holden Brooks.  When the flivvers suffers a malfunction, they land on an uninhabited planet with a nitrogen-argon atmosphere to make repairs.  The planet, it turns out, is not uninhabited after all.  A race of energy beings lives there, and a group of them take over the humans' bodies and begin manipulating their emotions, leading to a sexually charged encounter between Holden Brooks and Celestine Van Horne, and an attempt by Holden to murder Celestine's husband.  Holden realizes that the energy beings are actually children, and he manages to use an open flame (which they have never seen before, and which is the "portable star" of the title) to frighten them away long enough to regain control of himself and flee the planet.

Foundation timeline
"The Portable Star" was accompanied in the Winter 1955 issue of Thrilling Wonder Stories with a timeline of the Foundation series which included the story, along with a number of others.  The timeline does not include any of the stories from I, Robot, as well as the novel The Caves of Steel, since at this time Asimov considered the Robot series separate from the Foundation series.

References

External links

A review of "The Portable Star" by John H. Jenkins.
A review on io9.

Short stories by Isaac Asimov
1955 short stories
Works originally published in Wonder Stories